HornAfrik TV was a television network based in Mogadishu, Somalia. It was part of the HornAfrik Media Inc network, which also operated Radio HornAfrik, another radio station, a website and a training research center. According to MENASSAT, the Arab world media resource, HornAfrik TV during its existence operated six channels in Somali and Arabic, the two official languages of Somalia.

References

Defunct mass media in Somalia
Defunct television networks
HornAfrik Media Inc